Vijitha Berugoda is a Sri Lankan politician, a member of the Parliament of Sri Lanka. He belongs to the Sri Lanka Freedom Party. He has started his political career as the chairman of Bibila Pradeshiya Sabha in 1998. From 1999, after winning Provincial council election he became a member of Uva Provincial Council and continued until 2010.

References

Members of the 14th Parliament of Sri Lanka
Members of the 15th Parliament of Sri Lanka
Members of the 16th Parliament of Sri Lanka
Sri Lanka Freedom Party politicians
United People's Freedom Alliance politicians
Living people
1959 births
Sinhalese politicians